Johann Georg Leumann (30 August 1842 – 11 November 1918) was a Swiss politician and President of the Swiss Council of States (1900/1901).

External links 
 
 

1842 births
1918 deaths
Members of the Council of States (Switzerland)
Presidents of the Council of States (Switzerland)